The yellow-crowned brush-tailed rat (Isothrix bistriata) is a South American species of brush-tailed rat in the family Echimyidae. It is found in Bolivia, Brazil, Colombia, Ecuador, Peru, and Venezuela. They are nocturnal and arboreal animals found in lowland evergreen rainforest, probably restricted to igapó and várzea habitats. Sometimes they can be seen at the entrances of their dens, which are often in tree holes (especially hollow palms) on the borders of rivers.

References

Isothrix
Mammals of Bolivia
Mammals of Brazil
Mammals of Colombia
Mammals of Ecuador
Mammals of Peru
Mammals of Venezuela
Mammals described in 1845